Nutcase is a 1980 caper film directed by Roger Donaldson.

Plot
Evil Eva and her gang demand $5,000,000 or they will drop a nuclear bomb into the crater of Rangitoto. Three kids fight back.

Cast
 Melissa Donaldson as Nikki
 Peter Shand as Jamie
 Aaron Donaldson as Crunch
Jon Gadsby as Chief Inspector Cobblestone
Nevan Rowe as Evil Eva
Ian Watkin as Godzilla 
 Michael Wilson as McLooney 
Ian Mune as U-boat Commodore 
Clyde Scott as Murphy 
Jim Coates as Gribble

References

External links

 

1980 films
New Zealand television films
New Zealand comedy films
1980s English-language films
Films directed by Roger Donaldson